Kohen (kōhēn, "priest", pl. , kōhănīm, "priests") is the Hebrew word for "priest", used in reference to the Aaronic priesthood, also called Aaronites or Aaronides. Levitical priests or kohanim are traditionally believed and halakhically required to be of direct patrilineal descent from the biblical Aaron (also Aharon), brother of Moses.

During the existence of the Temple in Jerusalem, kohanim performed the daily and holiday (Yom Tov) duties of sacrificial offerings. Today, kohanim retain a lesser though distinct status within Rabbinic and Karaite Judaism and are bound by additional restrictions according to Orthodox Judaism.

In the Samaritan community, the kohanim have remained the primary religious leaders. Ethiopian Jewish religious leaders are sometimes called kahen, a form of the same word, but the position is not hereditary and their duties are more like those of rabbis than kohanim in most Jewish communities.

Etymology 
The word kohen originally derives from a Semitic root common at least to the Central Semitic languages; In the ancient polytheistic religion of Phoenicia, the word for priest was khn. The cognate Arabic word , kāhin means priest or "soothsayer, augur".

The noun kohen is used in the Torah to refer to priests, whether Jewish or pagan, such as the kohanim ("priests") of Baal (2 Kings 10:19) or Dagon, although Christian priests are referred to in modern Hebrew by the term komer.

Translations in the paraphrase of the Aramaic Targumic interpretations include "friend" in Targum Yonathan to 2 Kings 10:11, "master" in Targum to Amos 7:10, and "minister" in Mechilta to Parshah Jethro (Exodus 18:1–20:23). As a starkly different translation the title "worker" (Rashi on Exodus 29:30) and "servant" (Targum to Jeremiah 48:7), have been offered as a translation as well.

Biblical origins 

The status of kohen was conferred on Aaron, the brother of Moses, and his sons as an everlasting covenant or a covenant of salt. During the 40 years of wandering in the wilderness and until the Holy Temple was built in Jerusalem, the priests performed their priestly service in the portable Tabernacle. Their duties involved offering the daily and Jewish holiday sacrifices, and blessing the people in a Priestly Blessing, later also known as Nesiat Kapayim ("Raising of the hands").

In a broader sense, since Aaron was a descendant of the Tribe of Levi, priests are sometimes included in the term Levites, by direct patrilineal descent. However, not all Levites are priests.

When the Temple existed, most sacrifices and offerings could only be conducted by priests. Non-priest Levites (i.e. all those who descended from Levi, the son of Jacob, but not from Aaron) performed a variety of other Temple roles, including ritual slaughter of animals, song service by use of voice and musical instruments, and various tasks in assisting the priests in performing their service.

Torah law 

The Torah mentions Melchizedek king of Salem, identified by Rashi as being Shem the son of Noah, as a priest (kohen) to El Elyon (the supreme God). The second is Potiphera, priest of Heliopolis, then Jethro, priest of Midian, both pagan priests of their era.

When Esau sold the birthright of the first born to Jacob, Rashi explains that the priesthood was sold along with it, because by right the priesthood belongs to the first-born. Israel was supposed to become "a kingdom of priests and a holy nation" , but when Israel (except the Tribe of Levi) sinned in the incident of the golden calf, Moses broke the tablets containing the commandments , and then returned up the mountain after making two new tablets  to receive commandments which would form the basis of the lesser law which Israel would now have to follow. The lesser priesthood was given to the Tribe of Levi, which had not been tainted by this incident 

Moses received the priesthood under the hand of his father-in-law, Jethro, after which he spoke to the Lord via the burning bush. As a prophet, (one who speaks with God) he held this higher office within the priesthood. Aaron was ordained as the High Priest of the lesser priesthood or Aaronic Priesthood; which includes the Levitical; to parallel the lesser law the Israelites would now have to follow due to the Golden Calf incident and the subsequent revised covenant. .

Moses is referred to as a priest in Psalms 99:6, this refers to his being a prophet, which is an office within the higher Priesthood.

Aaron received the priesthood along with his children and any descendants that would be born subsequently. However, his grandson Phinehas had already been born, and did not receive the priesthood until he killed the prince of the Tribe of Simeon and the princess of the Midianites. Thereafter, this lesser priesthood has remained with the descendants of Aaron.

Vestments

The Torah provides for specific vestments to be worn by the priests when they are ministering in the Tabernacle: "And you shall make holy garments for Aaron your brother, for dignity and for beauty". The high priest wore eight holy garments (bigdei kodesh). Of these, four were of the same type worn by all priests, and four were unique to the Kohen Gadol.

Those vestments which were common to all priests, were:
 Priestly undergarments (Hebrew michnasayim) (breeches): linen pants reaching from the waist to the knees "to cover their nakedness"
 Priestly tunic (Hebrew ketonet) (tunic): made of pure linen, covering the entire body from the neck to the feet, with sleeves reaching to the wrists. That of the high priest was embroidered; those of the priests were plain.
 Priestly sash (Hebrew avnet) (sash): that of the high priest was of fine linen with "embroidered work" in blue and purple and scarlet; those worn by the priests were of white, twined linen.
 Priestly turban (Hebrew mitznefet): that of the high priest was much larger than that of the priests and wound so that it formed a broad, flat-topped turban; that for priests was wound so that it formed a cone-shaped turban, called a migbahat.

The vestments that were unique to the high priest were:
 Priestly robe (me'il) ("robe of the ephod"): a sleeveless, blue robe, the lower hem of which was fringed with small golden bells alternating with pomegranate-shaped tassels in blue, purple, and scarlet—tekhelet, argaman (purple), tolaat shani.
 Ephod: a richly embroidered vest or apron with two onyx engraved gemstones on the shoulders, on which were engraved the names of the tribes of Israel
 Priestly breastplate (Hebrew hoshen): with twelve gems, each engraved with the name of one of the tribes; a pouch in which he probably carried the Urim and Thummim. It was fastened to the Ephod
 On the front of the turban was a golden plate inscribed with the words: "Holiness unto YHWH" attached to the mitznefet.

The high priest, like all priests, would minister barefoot when he was serving in the Temple. Like all of the priests, he had to immerse himself in the ritual bath before vesting and wash his hands and his feet before performing any sacred act. The Talmud teaches that neither the kohanim nor the Kohen Gadol were fit to minister unless they wore their priestly vestments: "While they are clothed in the priestly garments, they are clothed in the priesthood; but when they are not wearing the garments, the priesthood is not upon them" (B.Zevachim 17:B). It is further taught that just as the sacrifices facilitate an atonement for sin, so do the priestly garments (B.Zevachim 88b). The high priest had two sets of holy garments: the "golden garments" detailed above, and a set of white "linen garments" (bigdei ha-bad) which he wore only on the Day of Atonement (Yom Kippur).  On that day, he would change his holy garments four times, beginning in the golden garments but changing into the Linen Garments for the two moments when he would enter the Holy of Holies (the first time to offer the blood of atonement and the incense, and the second time to retrieve the censer), and then change back again into the golden garments after each time.  He would immerse in the ritual bath before each change of garments, washing his hands and his feet after removing the garments and again before putting the other set on. The linen garments were only four in number, those corresponding to the garments worn by all priests (undergarments, tunic, sash and turban), but made only of white linen, with no embroidery. They could be worn only once, new sets being made each year.

High Priest 

In every generation when the Temple was standing, one kohen would be singled out to perform the functions of the High Priest (Hebrew kohen gadol). His primary task was the Day of Atonement service. Another unique task of the high priest was the offering of a daily meal sacrifice; he also held the prerogative to supersede any priest and offer any offering he chose. Although the Torah retains a procedure to select a High Priest when needed, in the absence of the Temple in Jerusalem, there is no High Priest in Judaism today.

Twenty-four kohanic divisions 

Prior to that time, the priestly courses numbered a mere eight. This newly instated a cycle of priestly courses, or priestly divisions, which repeated itself roughly twice each year.

When the First and Second Temples were built, the priests of Aaron's lineage assumed these roles in the Temple in Jerusalem. Each of the 24 groups consisted of six priestly families, with each of the six serving one day of the week. On the Sabbath day, all six worked in tandem. According to later rabbinical interpretation, these 24 groups changed every Sabbath at the completion of the Mussaf service.. However, on the biblical festivals all 24 were present in the Temple for duty.

According to the Jerusalem Talmud (Ta‘anith 4:2 / 20a): "Four wards came up out of exile: Yedaiah, Harim, Pašḥūr and Immer. The prophets among them had made a stipulation with them, namely, that even if Jehoiariv should come up out of exile, the officiating ward that serves in the Temple at that time should not be rejected on his account, but rather, he is to become secondary unto them."

Destruction of the Second Temple 
Following the Temple's destruction at the end of the First Jewish–Roman War and the displacement to the Galilee of the bulk of the remaining Jewish population in Judea at the end of the Bar Kokhba revolt, Jewish tradition in the Talmud and poems from the period record that the descendants of each priestly watch established a separate residential seat in towns and villages of the Galilee, and maintained this residential pattern for at least several centuries in anticipation of the reconstruction of the Temple and reinstitution of the cycle of priestly courses. Specifically, this kohanic settlement region stretched from the Beit Netofa Valley, through the Nazareth region to Arbel and the vicinity of Tiberias. In subsequent years, there was a custom of publicly recalling every Shabbat in the synagogues the courses of the priests, a practice that reinforced the prestige of the priests' lineage.

Professor Yosef Tobi, describing a stone inscription found in Yemen and which contains a partial list of the names (in Hebrew) of the twenty-four priestly courses and their places of residence, writes: "As for the probable strong spiritual attachment held by the Jews of Ḥimyar for the Land of Israel, this is also attested to by an inscription bearing the names of the miśmarōṯ (priestly wards), which was initially discovered in September 1970 by W. Müller and then, independently, by P. Grjaznevitch within a mosque in Bayt al-Ḥāḍir, a village situated near Tan‘im, east of Ṣanʻā’. This inscription has been published by several European scholars, but the seminal study was carried out by E.E. Urbach (1973), one of the most important scholars of rabbinic literature in the previous generation. The priestly wards were seen as one of the most distinctive elements in the collective memory of the Jewish people as a nation during the period of Roman and Byzantine rule in the Land of Israel following the destruction of the Second Temple, insofar as they came to symbolize Jewish worship within the Land."

It is now uncertain when this stone inscription was first engraved, but certainly it dates back to a time near the Second Temple’s destruction. The complete list of sacerdotal names would normally have included twenty-four priestly wards. However, today, the stone inscription contains only a partial list of their names, with their former places of residence – beginning from the fourth ward, and ending with the fourteenth ward. This was because the stone had been partially broken away, as also part of which was hidden underground. This is the longest roster of names of this kind ever discovered unto this day:

Mishnah and Talmud

Qualifications and disqualifications 

Although kohanim may assume their duties once they reached physical maturity, the fraternity of kohanim generally would not allow young kohanim to begin service until they reached the age of twenty, and some opinions state that this age was thirty. There was no mandatory retirement age. Only when a kohen became physically infirm could he no longer serve.

A kohen may become disqualified from performing his service for a host of reasons, including, but not limited to, Tumah, marital defilements, and physical blemishes. Of importance is that the kohen is never permanently disqualified from service but is permitted to return to his normal duties once the disqualification ceases.

Twenty-four kohanic gifts 
The kohanim were compensated for their service to the nation and in the Temple through the twenty-four kohanic gifts. Of these 24 gifts, 10 are listed as to be given even outside the land of Israel. An example of the gifts given to the kohen in the Jewish diaspora are most notably the five shekels of the pidyon haben ceremony, and the giving of the foreleg, cheeks and abomasum from each Kosher-slaughtered animal.

Torah instruction 

Torah verses and rabbinical commentary to the Tanakh imply that the kohen has a unique leadership role amongst the nation of Israel. In addition to the well-known role of the kohen to officiate in the sacrificial activity in the Temple (the Korbanot), the kohen is presumed to have the responsibility of being knowledgeable in the laws and nuances of the Torah and to be able to give accurate instruction in those laws to the Jewish people.

Rabbi Samson Raphael Hirsch explains this responsibility as not being the exclusive Torah instructors, but working in tandem with the rabbinic leaders of the era, while other rabbinic greats – notably the Chasam Sofer and Maharitz Chayes – acknowledged a unique assignment of torah instruction to the descendants of Aaron.

Modern application 
After the destruction of the Second Temple and the suspension of sacrificial offerings, the formal role of priests in sacrificial services came to an end temporarily (until the rebuilding of the temple once more). Kohanim, however, retain a formal and public ceremonial role in synagogue prayer services. Kohanim also have a limited number of other special duties and privileges in Jewish religious practice. These special roles have been maintained in Orthodox Judaism, and sometimes in Conservative Judaism. Reform Judaism does not afford any special status or recognition to kohanim.

Synagogue aliyah 
Every Monday, Thursday and Shabbat in Orthodox synagogues (and many Conservative ones as well), a portion from the Torah is read aloud in the original Hebrew in front of the congregation. On weekdays, this reading is divided into three; it is customary to call a kohen for the first reading (aliyah), a Levite for the second reading, and an "Israelite"  (non-kohen or non-levi) to the third reading. On Shabbat, the reading is divided into seven portions; a kohen is called for the first aliyah, a levite to the second, and "Israelites" for the rest. The Maftir portion may be given to someone from any of the three groups. 

If a kohen is not present, it is customary in many communities for a Levite to take the first aliyah "bimkom kohen" (in the place of a kohen) and an Israelite the second and succeeding ones. This custom is not required by halakha (Jewish law), however (and some opinions discourage it), and Israelites may be called up for all aliyot. If there is no Levite, the kohen is called for the second aliyah as well.

In the late 12th and early 13th century, Rabbi Meir of Rothenburg ruled that, in a community consisting entirely of kohanim, the prohibition on calling kohanim for anything but the first two and maftir aliyot creates a deadlock situation which should be resolved by calling women to the Torah for all the intermediate aliyot.  However, this opinion is rejected by virtually all Halachic authorities, and it is not even mentioned in Shulchan Aruch or its commentaries.

The Conservative Rabbinical Assembly's Committee on Jewish Law and Standards (CJLS), consistent with the Conservative movement's general view of the role of kohanim, has ruled that the practice of calling a kohen to the first aliyah represents a custom rather than a law, and that accordingly, a Conservative rabbi is not obligated to follow it. As such, in some Conservative synagogues, this practice is not followed.

Priests (and in their absence, occasionally Levites) are also the first offered the opportunity to lead the communal grace after meals. Unlike the general rule for aliyot, this offer - which is only a requirement according to some Rabbinic opinions - may be declined. There are other rules regarding the honoring of kohanim, even in the absence of the Temple, but generally these are waived (if they are even offered) by the kohen.

Priestly blessing 

The kohanim participating in an Orthodox and some other styles of traditional Jewish prayer service also deliver the priestly blessing, during the repetition of the Shemoneh Esrei. They perform this service by standing and facing the crowd in the front of the congregation, with their arms held outwards and their hands and fingers in a specific formation, with a Jewish prayer shawl or Talit covering their heads and outstretched hands so that their fingers cannot be seen. Kohanim living in Israel and many Sephardic Jews living in areas outside Israel deliver the priestly blessing daily; Ashkenazi Jews living outside Israel deliver it only on Jewish holidays.

Pidyon haben (redemption of the firstborn) 

Outside the synagogue, the kohen leads the pidyon haben ceremony. This redemption of the first born son is based on the Torah commandment, "all the first-born of man among thy sons shalt thou redeem".

Effects on marital status 
Orthodox Judaism recognizes the rules regulating marriage for Jews of priestly lineage as being in full force. Rabbinic courts will uphold the laws and will not officiate in a marriage that involves a man who is a kohen and a Jewish woman who is divorced from an earlier marriage.

A priest of Aaron's lineage (i.e. a kohen) is forbidden by the Torah to marry a divorced woman even if she were a native Israelite. Likewise, a male descendant from Aaron's line is prohibited to marry a Jewish woman who has had intercourse with a non-Jew, whether she had been raped or she had willfully done so. So, too, he cannot marry a Jewish woman whose birth was by a father who is a kohen but who violated one of these prohibitions. If he did one of these three things, his male issue born from such union is no longer a priest (i.e. kohen), but rather becomes Ḥallal, a term designating one who is no longer a priest, but profaned.

A priest must maintain an untainted lineage, and his mother must be of Jewish birth. If he married a non-Jewish woman from the gentile nations, his children are no longer priests, but gentiles. Had a priest of Aaron's lineage transgressed this prohibition and married a divorced woman, and they had children together, all of his female issue - whether his, or his sons, or his grandchildren - would be prohibited from marrying into the priestly line for all generations.

Rape poses an especially poignant problem. The pain experienced by the families of kohanim who were required to divorce their wives as the result of the rapes accompanying the capture of Jerusalem is alluded to in this Mishnah:
If a woman were imprisoned by non-Jews concerning money affairs, she is permitted to her husband, but if for some capital offense, she is forbidden to her husband. If a town were overcome by besieging troops, all women of priestly stock found in it are ineligible [to be married to priests or to remain married to priests], but if they had witnesses, even a slave, or even a bondswoman, these may be believed. But no man may be believed for himself. Rabbi Zechariah ben Hakatsab said, "By this Temple, her hand did not stir from my hand from the time the non-Jews entered Jerusalem until they went out." They said to him: No man may give evidence of himself.

Israel
The Israeli rabbinate will not perform a marriage halakhically forbidden to a kohen. For example, a kohen cannot legally marry a divorced or converted woman in the State of Israel, although a foreign marriage would be recognized.

Conservative Jewish view 
Conservative Judaism has issued an emergency takanah (rabbinical edict) temporarily suspending the application of the rules in their entirety, on the grounds that the high intermarriage rate threatens the survival of Judaism, and hence that any marriage between Jews is welcomed. The takanah declares that the offspring of such marriages are to be regarded as kohanim. The movement allows a kohen to marry a convert or divorcee for these reasons:
 Since the Temple in Jerusalem is no longer extant and korbanot should not be restored, kohanim are no longer able to perform Temple services in a state of ritual purity.
 Because the intermarriage crisis among American Jewry is an extreme situation, the Conservative movement feels it must support the decision of two Jews to marry.

Kohanim to this day maintain the general prohibition of not being exposed to the dead (within the same room, at a cemetery, and elsewhere).

Bat kohen 

Kohen was a status that traditionally referred to men, passed from father to son, although there were situations where a bat kohen, daughter of a kohen, enjoyed some special status. For example, the first-born son of a bat kohen, or the first-born son of a bat levi (the daughter of any levite) did not require the ritual of pidyon haben. 

In addition, females, although they did not serve in the Tabernacle or the Temple, were permitted to eat or benefit from some of the 24 kohanic gifts. However, if a kohen's daughter married a man from outside the kohanic line, she was no longer permitted to benefit from the kohanic gifts. Conversely, the daughter of a non-kohen who married a kohen took on the same rights as an unmarried daughter of a kohen.

Modern times 
Today, Orthodox and many Conservative rabbis maintain the position that only a man can act as a kohen, and that a daughter of a kohen is recognized as a bat kohen only in those very limited ways that have been identified in the past. Other Conservative rabbis, along with some Reform and Reconstructionist rabbis, are prepared to give equal kohen status to the daughter of a kohen.

Orthodox Judaism maintains that the privileges and status of kohanim stem primarily from their offerings and activities in the Temple. Accordingly, in Orthodox Judaism only men can perform the Priestly Blessing and receive the first aliyah during the public Torah reading, and women are generally not permitted to officiate in a Pidyon HaBen ceremony. However, the question of what acts (if any) a bat kohen can perform in an Orthodox context is a subject of current discussion and debate in some Orthodox circles.

Some women's prayer groups that practice under the halakhic guidance of non-Orthodox rabbis, and which conduct Torah readings for women only, have adapted a custom of calling a bat kohen for the first aliyah and a bat levi for the second.

Conservative Judaism, consistent with its view that sacrifices in the Temple will not be restored and in light of many congregations' commitment to gender (but not caste) egalitarianism, interprets the Talmudic relevant passages to permit elimination of most distinctions between male and female kohanim in congregations that retain traditional tribal roles while modifying traditional gender roles. The Conservative movement bases this leniency on the view that the privileges of the kohen come not from offering Temple offerings but solely from lineal sanctity, and that ceremonies like the Priestly Blessing should evolve from their Temple-based origins. (The argument for women's involvement in the Priestly Blessing acknowledges that only male kohanim could perform this ritual in the days of the Temple, but that the ceremony is no longer rooted in Temple practice; its association with the Temple was by rabbinic decree; and rabbis therefore have the authority to permit the practice to evolve from its Temple-based roots). As a result, some Conservative synagogues permit a bat kohen to perform the Priestly Blessing and the Pidyon HaBen ceremony, and to receive the first aliyah during the Torah reading.

The Conservative halakha committee in Israel has ruled that women do not receive such aliyot and cannot validly perform such functions (rabbi Robert Harris, 5748). Therefore, not all Conservative congregations or rabbis permit these roles for bnot kohanim (daughters of priests). Moreover, many egalitarian-oriented Conservative synagogues have abolished traditional tribal roles and do not perform ceremonies involving kohanim (such as the Priestly Blessing or calling a kohen to the first aliyah), and many traditionalist Conservative synagogues have retained traditional gender roles and do not permit women to perform these roles at all.

Because most Reform and Reconstructionist temples have abolished traditional tribal distinctions, roles, and identities on grounds of egalitarianism, a special status for a bat kohen has very little significance in these movements.

Genetic testing 

Since the Y chromosome is inherited only from one's father (women have no Y chromosome), all direct male lineages share a common haplotype. Therefore, testing was done across sectors of the Jewish and non-Jewish population to see if there was any commonality among their Y chromosomes. The initial research by Hammer, Skorecki, et al. was based on a limited study of 188 subjects, which identified a narrow set of genetic markers found in slightly more than 50% of Jews with a tradition of priestly descent and approximately 5% of Jews who did not believe themselves to be kohanim.

Over the succeeding decade, Hammer, Skorecki, and other researchers continued to collect genetic material from Jewish and non-Jewish populations around the world. The most recent results suggest that 46% of those who have a family tradition of being Cohanim belong to the Y-DNA haplogroup identified as J-P58, and that at least two-thirds of that 46% have very similar Y-DNA sequences indicating comparatively recent common ancestry. A further 14% of kohanim were found to belong to another lineage, in haplogroup J2a-M410. In contrast, the so-called Cohen Modal Haplotype (CMH), a characteristic Y chromosome haplotype earlier identified in a majority of men self-reporting as kohanim, is found in as much as 5% to 8% of Jews who have no family tradition of being kohanim, and only 1.5% were found to have the closest match to the most detailed sequence. Amongst non-Jews, the CMH can be found among non-Jewish Yemenites (>67.7%) and Jordanians (~7%), but none were found to most closely match the most detailed sequence.

Cohen (and its variations) as a surname 

The status of kohen in Judaism has no necessary relationship to a person's surname. Although descendants of kohanim often bear surnames that reflect their genealogy, there are many families with the surname Cohen (or any number of variations) who are not kohanim nor even Jewish. Conversely, there are many kohanim who do not have Cohen as a surname.

There are numerous variations to the spelling of the surname Cohen. These are often corrupted by translation or transliteration into or from other languages, as exemplified below (not a complete list).

 English: Cohen, Kohen, Cowen, Cowan, Cahn, Kahn, Cahan, Carne, Cohn, Cone, Conn, Conway, Cohan, Cohaner, Cahanman, Chapman, Chaplan, Keohan, Kaplan, Katz (a Hebrew abbreviation for kohen zedek (כהן צדק) "righteous priest"), HaCohen, (Cohan is also an Irish surname and Conway is also a surname of Welsh origin)
 German: Kohn, Cohn, Kogen, Kohen, Korn, Prohn, Prohen,  Chapman, Kuhn, Kahn, Cahn, Kane, Kaner, Konel, Cön/Coen, Jachmann, Jachmann-Kohn, Jachkone, Kogenmann, Kogenman, Kogner, Kogener, Kagen, Cohner, Kohner, Kahnmann, Kahaneman, Cahnmann, Korenfeld
 Armenian: Kohanian, Kohanyan
 Basque: Apeztegui ("priestly house"), Apéstegui, Apesteguia, Apaestegui, Aphesteguy
 Dutch: Cohen, Käin, Kohen, Chapman, Chaplin, Kohn, Kon, Cogen
 French: Cahen, Cohen, Caen, Cahun, Chapman, Chon, Kahane, Kohen
 Georgian: Koenishvili, Kohen
 Greek: Koen, Kots, Kotais, Kotatis, Kothanis (see Romaniote Jews)
Somali: Kaahin
 Hungarian: Kohn, Kohen, Korn, Korenfeld, Káhán, Konel
 Italian: Coen, Cohen, Kohen, Prohen, Sacerdote ("priest"), Sacerdoti, Sacerdoti Coen, Rappaport (and variants)
 Serbian: Koen, Kohen, Kon, Kojen
 Persian: Koaen, Kohan, Kohen, Kohanzâd, Kohanchi, Kohani, Kohanqâdoš, Kohanteb
 Polish: Kon, Kochan, Chapman, Jach, Kaplan, Kaplin, Kaplon
 Portuguese: Cão, Cunha, Coutinho, Correia, Coelho
 Romanian: Cozer
 Russian: Kogan, Kogen, Kogon, Kogensohn, Kagan, Kaganovich, Kaganovsky, Kohen, Kokhen (Kochen), Kazhdan/Kazdan/Kasdan (in Hebrew, this name is spelled "kaf-shin-daled-nun" and is an acronym for "Kohanei Shluchei DeShmaya Ninhu," which is Aramaic for "priests are the messengers of heaven")
 Spanish: Coen, Cohen, Koen, Kohen, Cannoh, Canno, Canoh, Coy, Cano, Cao, Corena, Correa
 Turkish: Kohen, Köhen, Akohen, Erkohen, Kohener, Özsezikli, Duek, Dovek, Kan, Bildirici, Şapkacıoğlu, Öztuzcu, Yanarocak
 Arabic: al-Kohen, al-Kahen, al-Kahin, Tawil, Tabili, Taguili
 Ancient/Modern Hebrew: Kohen, HaKohen, ben-Kohen, bar-Kohen, Koheni, Kahana, Kohanim, Kohen-Tzedek/Kohen-Tzadik (Katz)
 Others: Maze, Mazo, Mazer (acronym of the Hebrew phrase mi zera Aharon, meaning "from [the] seed [of] Aaron [the Kohen/Priest]"), Azoulai (acronym of the Hebrew phrase ishah zonah ve'challelah lo yikachu, meaning "a foreign [non-Israelite woman] or divorced [Israelite woman] shall not he [a Kohen] take": prohibition binding on kohanim), Kahane

In contemporary Israel, "Moshe Cohen" is the equivalent of "John Smith" in English-speaking countries – i.e., proverbially the most common of names.

Seder 

One common interpretation of the practice of having three pieces of matzah on a Seder plate is that they represent "Kohen, Levi and Yisrael" (i.e., the priests, the tribe of Levi, and all other Jewish people).

Outside Judaism 
According to the Church of Jesus Christ of Latter-day Saints, either "literal descendants of Aaron", or worthy Melchizedek priesthood holders have the legal right to constitute the Presiding Bishopric under the authority of the First Presidency. To date, all men who have served on the Presiding Bishopric have been Melchizedek priesthood holders, and none have been publicly identified as descendants of Aaron. See also Mormonism and Judaism.

References in popular culture 
The positioning of the kohen's hands during the Priestly Blessing was Leonard Nimoy's inspiration for Mr. Spock's Vulcan salute in the original Star Trek television series. Nimoy, raised an Orthodox Jew (but not a kohen), used the salute when saying "Live long and prosper."

The Priestly Blessing was used by Leonard Cohen in his farewell blessing during "Whither Thou Goest", the closing song on his concerts. Leonard Cohen himself was from a kohen family. He also used the drawing of the Priestly Blessing as one of his logos.

See also

Footnotes

Bibliography 
 Isaac Klein A Guide to Jewish Religious Practice, p. 387–388. (Conservative view prior to takkanah on kohen marriages.)
 Isaac Klein Responsa and Halakhic Studies, p. 22–26. (Conservative view prior to takkanah on kohen marriages.)
 K. Skorecki, S. Selig, S. Blazer, R. Bradman, N. Bradman, P. J. Waburton, M. Ismajlowicz, M. F. Hammer (1997). Y Chromosomes of Jewish Priests. Nature 385, 32. (Available online: DOI | Full text (HTML) | Full text (PDF))
 Proceedings of the CJLS: 1927–1970, volume III, United Synagogue Book Service. (Conservative)
 Mishnayoth:Seder Nashim. Translated and Annotated by Philip Blackman. Judaica Press Ltd., 2000. pp. 134–135

External links

Kehuna.org, the kohen's contemporary online resource
Genetic Genealogy: Aaron and the Cohen Model Haplotype
The Laws of Birchat Kohanim – the Priestly Blessing Chabad.org
Holy Matrimony? All about the kohen or Jewish priest's prohibitions in marriage.
The Cohen-Levi Family Heritage
High priest's official apparel depicted 
Kohanim center and network Europe

 
Aaron
Descent from antiquity
Jewish religious occupations
Jewish sacrificial law
Kohenitic surnames
Levites